The Bhatti Rajputs of Kapurthala were the rulers of Kapurthala from 11th century to 1772. Bhatti is a Punjabi version of the Rajput clan name Bhati. They had common ancestry with the Bhati rajputs of Jaisalmer

Rulers

Nawab Kapur singh Rajput From Jaisalmer 
Kapur founded the town of Kapurthala in 11th century. He was a Bhati Rajput of Jaisalmer and the founder of the Kapurthala Bhatti lineage.

Rai Bahram Bhatti
Rai Bahram Bhatti married his daughter Bhatiyani Murtaza Begum to Malerkotla in 1458.

Rai Ran Deo
Rai Ran Deo founded the town of Batala in 1465.

Rai Ibrahim Bhatti
In 1773, Rai Ibrahim Bhatti was defeated by Jassa Singh Ahluwalia and was reduced to a tributary. In 1779, Kapurthala was completely annexed by Jassa Singh into the princely state of Kapurthala after Rai Ibrahim Bhatti refused to pay tribute.

List of Rulers
Rana Kapur (11th century)
Rai Bahram Bhatti (1458)
Rai Ran Deo Bhatti (1465)
Rai Ibrahim Bhatti (1773-1779)

References

Rajput clans